Kikoko sublocation is one of the coldest places in Makueni County. Its brags of one of the oldest mission centers in Kenya accommodating the prestigious Precious Blood Secondary School - Kilungu. Kenya's Eastern Province.

References 

Populated places in Eastern Province (Kenya)